Tabor is the surname of:

 Ashley Tabor (born 1977), British businessman, founder of Global
 Augusta Tabor (1833–1895), American philanthropist and first wife of Horace Tabor
 Elizabeth Baby Doe Tabor (1854–1935), second wife of Horace Tabor
 Charles F. Tabor (1841–1900), American lawyer, politician and New York State Attorney General
 David Tabor (1913–2005), British physicist
 Hans Tabor (1922–2003), Danish diplomat, politician and Foreign Minister of Denmark (1967-1968) 
 Harry Zvi Tabor (1917–2015), Israeli physicist
 Herbert Tabor (1918–2020), American biochemist and physician-scientist
 Horace Tabor (1830–1899), millionaire miner and U.S. senator
 James Tabor (born 1946), New Testament and religious studies scholar
 Jim Tabor (1916–1953), American Major League Baseball player
 Joan Tabor (1932–1968), American film and TV actress
 Jordan Tabor (1990–2014), English footballer
 June Tabor (born 1947), English singer, predominantly of folk music
 Michael Tabor (born 1941), British businessman, father of Ashley
 Michael Tabor (Black Panther) (1946–2010), African-American member of the Black Panther Party acquitted of conspiracy to bomb public buildings
 Phil Tabor (born 1956), American former National Football League player
 Teez Tabor (born 1995), American football player
 Ty Tabor (born 1961), lead guitarist, songwriter and backup vocalist for the band King's X
 William Tabor (1842–1867), English cricketer

Occupational surnames
Surnames from given names